Ali Germaine Landry (born July 21, 1973) is an American actress, model, and beauty pageant titleholder who won Miss USA 1996. She played Rita Lefleur on the UPN sitcom Eve and was the Doritos Girl in a 1998 Super Bowl commercial. In 1998, she was named by People magazine as one of 50 most beautiful people in the world.

Early life 
Landry was named after Ali MacGraw after her mother had seen the 1970 film Love Story.  Landry grew up in Cecilia, Louisiana, the daughter of Renella (Ray) and Gene Allen Landry. Landry is of French (Cajun) descent. She attended Cecilia High School, graduating in 1991. In high school, she was captain of the cheerleaders.  She attended the University of Southwestern Louisiana, now University of Louisiana at Lafayette, and majored in mass communication. She is a member of Kappa Delta sorority.

Pageantry
Her first foray into pageantry came in 1990 when she was crowned Miss Louisiana Teen USA.  She represented Louisiana in the 1990 Miss Teen USA pageant held in Biloxi, Mississippi in July 1990, where she placed first in the preliminary swimsuit and evening gown competitions, but was ranked seventh during the final competition.

In 1995, Landry won the 1996 Miss Louisiana USA title, becoming the first former Miss Louisiana Teen USA to win the Miss USA crown.  She went on to compete in the 1996 Miss USA pageant, which was broadcast live from South Padre Island, Texas in February 1996 – she placed third highest after the preliminary competition and second highest on average during the final Top 10 competition.  She was the highest placed of the Top 6 finalists and eventually went on to win the 1996 title.

She is the first former Miss Teen USA delegate to win the Miss USA crown outright (her predecessor Shanna Moakler, previously Miss Rhode Island Teen USA, Miss New York USA  and first runner-up to Miss USA Chelsi Smith, only inherited the title after Smith became Miss Universe).

Landry competed in the 1996 Miss Universe pageant held in Las Vegas in May that year.  She placed first in the preliminary competition and was ranked second in the evening gown and interview events during the final competition. She was second going into the next round of six delegates, but she was eliminated after the judges' questions.

Until 1999, Landry was the only former Miss Teen USA delegate to compete at Miss Universe. Her record at all three pageants was not surpassed until 2000 when Miss USA 2000, Lynnette Cole made the top 5 at all three pageants.

Post-pageants
Landry has done much modeling for photographers and magazines. As a spokeswoman for the Doritos chips brand, she appeared in celebrated TV commercials airing during the 1998, 1999 and 2000 Super Bowl football games.  She was named by People magazine as one of the 50 most beautiful people in the world in 1998.  Her house was featured on E!'s celebrity homes and on MTV's Cribs.  She has been listed as one of FHM magazine's 100 Sexiest Women in the World numerous times.  She was twice named on Stuff Magazine'''s 100 Sexiest Women list. Askmen.com has named her one of the 50 Most Beautiful Women and 99 Most Desirable Women in the World.

In 2002, she hosted the second season of the hidden-camera series Spy TV.  From 2003 to 2006, she was a regular cast member of the UPN sitcom Eve.

Landry has participated in the show Fear Factor and was runner-up. She is an avid athlete and also participated in the Boston Marathon.

She has hosted the English and Spanish-language versions of Spotlight to Nightlight, an interview show on Yahoo! where she talks with celebrity mothers about parenting issues.  She also launched a lifestyle line, Belle Parish in 2009.  Belle Parish launched with a children's clothing line in September 2009, to be in stores spring 2010.  The line is inspired by her Southern upbringing and the keepsake items her mother saved from her childhood.

Landry starred in (and was the executive producer of) TV Guide Network's show, Hollywood Moms' Club, in November 2011. For the year 2012 she was the new face and spokesmodel of Palmer's Cocoa Butter Formula, following in the footsteps of celeb moms Samantha Harris and Laila Ali who  previously posed for Palmer's.

Personal life
Landry met actor and TV personality Mario Lopez when he presented the Miss Teen USA 1998 pageant and she was a commentator.
They were engaged during the summer of 2003 and married on April 24, 2004, in a Roman Catholic ceremony in front of 50 guests at the exclusive Las Alamandas resort outside Puerto Vallarta, Mexico. Two weeks later, she had the marriage annulled after learning that Lopez was unfaithful during his bachelor party before the wedding.

She married film director Alejandro Gómez Monteverde on April 8, 2006, in San Miguel de Allende, Mexico. They have three children: a daughter born in July 2007, and sons born in October 2011 and July 2013. Their son Valentin's middle name was inspired by Pope Francis, as Landry and Monteverde met him while she was pregnant and he blessed the baby.

Her father-in-law, Juan Manuel Gómez Fernández, and brother-in-law, Juan Manuel Gómez Monteverde, were found dead with fatal head wounds in Pueblo Viejo, in the Mexican state of Veracruz, on September 19, 2015, approximately two weeks after they were kidnapped from their home in nearby Tamaulipas. On November 9, 2015, six people were arrested for the kidnapping and murder of Gómez Fernández and Gómez Monteverde.  The suspects were allegedly holding six Central American nationals hostage at the time of their arrest, according to the Chief of the Mexican Federal Police.

Filmography

Landry and her husband Alejandro Monteverde made the film Bella together. Bella was directed by Monteverde and was produced by their business partners Sean Wolfington, Eduardo Verástegui, Leo Severino, and Denise Pinckley. Monteverde and the filmmakers received honors for Bella from the Toronto Film Festival, the Smithsonian and the White House. The Smithsonian Latino Center honored Monteverde with their "Legacy Award". Monteverde was also given the "Outstanding American by Choice" award for Bella'''s positive contribution to Latino art and culture in the U.S.

US President George W. Bush and First Lady Laura Bush saw the film and invited Monteverde to sit with Laura Bush in her private box during the annual State of the Union speech in 2007.

References

External links
 RE/SHAPE by Ali Landry

1973 births
American cheerleaders
Female models from Louisiana
American television actresses
Cajun people
Living people
Miss Photogenic at Miss USA
1990 beauty pageant contestants
20th-century Miss Teen USA delegates
Miss Universe 1996 contestants
Miss USA 1996 delegates
Miss USA winners
People from Cecilia, Louisiana
University of Louisiana at Lafayette alumni
20th-century American people
21st-century American women
American people of French descent